Miraval Studios is a recording studio located in the Château de Miraval, a 900 hectares estate located in Correns, in the Var department of Provence (France). Founded in 1977 by French jazz pianist Jacques Loussier and sound engineer Patrice Quef, it was in operation under the name Studio Miraval until the mid-2000s, but sat unused after the acquisition of the estate by actors Brad Pitt and Angelina Jolie in 2011.

Frequented and used by many world-class bands such as Pink Floyd, AC/DC and The Cranberries, Brad Pitt and French producer Damien Quintard reopened the fully restored and refurbished studios under the name Miraval Studios in October 2022.

Studio Miraval (1977 – 2000s) 

For hundreds of years, the Miraval estate in the south of France has inspired artisans, vintners and musicians alike with its simple, otherworldly beauty. Surrounded by gardens, stone terraces, fountains and a forest of white oak and evergreen, the 900-acre property has produced wines and olives since the 13th century.

In 1977, the estate's then-owner, French pianist and composer Jacques Loussier,  and sound engineer Patrice Quef built a state-of-the-art recording studio on the property, the Studio Miraval. Loussier began by recording his own work, mainly for films, and then started taking on French artists such as Maxime Le Forestier and Pierre Vassiliu.

Miraval achieved fame thanks to Pink Floyd, who came there in 1979 to record part of their album The Wall. Subsequently, equipped with one of the first SSL mixing consoles in France, Miraval recorded AC/DC, Judas Priest, The Cranberries, The Cure, Muse, Wham!, Level 42, David Sylvian (solo and with Rain Tree Crow), Chris Rea, Sade, the Go-Betweens, Steve Winwood, Yes, UB40, Chris Braide, Shirley Bassey, the Gipsy Kings, Shakatak, Rammstein, Fonky Family, Kelly Family, Blankass, Silmarils, Jimmy Barnes and many others. Later on, in the early and middle 2000s, Rammstein recorded the album Mutter, and Courtney Love also spent a few weeks in the estate. In 2006, Muse recorded some tracks for Black Holes and Revelations

In 1998, Loussier sold Miraval to businessman–turned–wine producer Tom Bove who resold it in 2011 to actors Brad Pitt and Angelina Jolie who decided not to operate the studio anymore.

Miraval Studios (2022–present) 
During the summer of 2022, Brad Pitt, now separated from Angelina Jolie (who sold her shares in the Miraval estate), and French producer Damien Quintard reopened the completely redesigned and refurbished studios under the name  Miraval Studios. Sade were the first band to record there. They were officially reopened on October 10th, 2022. 

Brad Pitt, who has a passion for architecture and built homes for Hurricane Katrina victims through his Make It Right Foundation, and Damien Quintard, multiple award-winning producer, met in Paris and share a common vision "for a recording studio that feels just like home".

One of the studio's first additions is a console with hybrid analog and digital capabilities, a Dolby Atmos system, and all the technology needed to pre-mix for film and television projects. Recording booths and workstations for sound and video editing are also included.

References

External links 
 Official site

Recording studios in France
1977 establishments in France
Buildings and structures in Var (department)
Companies based in Provence-Alpes-Côte d'Azur